Carlos Leitão is a Canadian politician in Quebec, who was elected to the National Assembly of Quebec in the 2014 election. He represented the electoral district of Robert-Baldwin as a member of the Quebec Liberal Party until his retirement from politics at the 2022 Quebec general election. He was appointed  Quebec minister of Finance on April 23, 2014 by Philippe Couillard.

Prior to his election to the legislature, he was the chief economist for Laurentian Bank Securities.

Originally from Portugal, Leitão moved to Canada in 1975. He is a graduate of McGill University.

References

Quebec Liberal Party MNAs
Living people
Canadian economists
Politicians from Montreal
Portuguese emigrants to Canada
McGill University alumni
1959 births
People from Peniche, Portugal
21st-century Canadian politicians
Laurentian Bank of Canada
Members of the Executive Council of Quebec
Finance ministers of Quebec